In mathematics, the inverse function of a function  (also called the inverse of ) is a function that undoes the operation of . The inverse of  exists if and only if  is bijective, and if it exists, is denoted by 

For a function , its inverse  admits an explicit description:  it sends each element  to the unique element  such that .

To undo this, one adds 7 to the input, then divides the result by 5.

Definitions

Let  be a function whose domain is the set , and whose codomain is the set .

If  is invertible, then there is exactly one function  satisfying this property.

The function  is invertible if and only if it is bijective. This is because the condition  for all  implies that  is injective, and the condition  for all  implies that  is surjective.

The inverse function  to  can be explicitly described as the function

.

Inverses and composition

Recall that if  is an invertible function with domain  and codomain , then

Using the composition of functions, this statement can be rewritten to the following equations between functions:

  and 

where  is the identity function on the set ; that is, the function that leaves its argument unchanged. In category theory, this statement is used as the definition of an inverse morphism.

Considering function composition helps to understand the notation . Repeatedly composing a function  with itself is called iteration.

Notation
The notation  might be used for the inverse function to avoid ambiguity with the multiplicative inverse.

To avoid any confusion, an inverse trigonometric function is often indicated by the prefix "arc" (for Latin ). Similarly, the inverse of a hyperbolic function is indicated by the prefix "ar" (for Latin ). Note that the expressions like  can still be useful to distinguish the multivalued inverse from the partial inverse: . Other inverse special functions are sometimes prefixed with the prefix "inv", if the ambiguity of the  notation should be avoided.

Examples

Squaring and square root functions
Therefore,  is not invertible.

If the domain of the function is restricted to the nonnegative reals, that is, we take the function  with the same rule as before, then the function is bijective and so, invertible.

Standard inverse functions 
The following table shows several standard functions and their inverses:

Formula for the inverse 
Many functions given by algebraic formulas possess a formula for their inverse. This is because the inverse  of an invertible function  has an explicit description as

 .

This allows one to easily determine inverses of many functions that are given by algebraic formulas. For example, if  is the function

 

then to determine  for a real number , one must find the unique real number  such that . This equation can be solved:

 

Thus the inverse function  is given by the formula

 

Sometimes, the inverse of a function cannot be expressed by a closed-form formula. For example, if  is the function

 

then  is a bijection, and therefore possesses an inverse function . The formula for this inverse has an expression as an infinite sum:

Properties
Since a function is a special type of binary relation, many of the properties of an inverse function correspond to properties of converse relations.

Uniqueness
If an inverse function exists for a given function , then it is unique.

Symmetry
There is a symmetry between a function and its inverse.

 and 

The involutory nature of the inverse can be concisely expressed by 

The inverse of a composition of functions is given by 

For example, let  and let . Then the composition  is the function that first multiplies by three and then adds five,

 

To reverse this process, we must first subtract five, and then divide by three,

 

This is the composition
.

Self-inverses

 

Such a function is called an involution.

Graph of the inverse

If   is invertible, then the graph of the function

 

is the same as the graph of the equation

 

This is equivalent to reflecting the graph across the line
.

Inverses and derivatives
The inverse function theorem states that a continuous function  is invertible on its range (image) if and only if it is either strictly increasing or decreasing (with no local maxima or minima). For example, the function

 

is invertible, since the derivative
 is always positive.

If , the derivative of the inverse is given by the inverse function theorem,

 

Using Leibniz's notation the formula above can be written as

 

This result follows from the chain rule (see the article on inverse functions and differentiation).

The inverse function theorem can be generalized to functions of several variables.

Real-world examples 
 Let  be the function that converts a temperature in degrees Celsius to a temperature in degrees Fahrenheit,  then its inverse function converts degrees Fahrenheit to degrees Celsius,  since 
 Suppose  assigns each child in a family its birth year. An inverse function would output which child was born in a given year. However, if the family has children born in the same year (for instance, twins or triplets, etc.) then the output cannot be known when the input is the common birth year. As well, if a year is given in which no child was born then a child cannot be named. But if each child was born in a separate year, and if we restrict attention to the three years in which a child was born, then we do have an inverse function. For example, 
 Let  be the function that leads to an  percentage rise of some quantity, and  be the function producing an  percentage fall. Applied to $100 with  = 10%, we find that applying the first function followed by the second does not restore the original value of $100, demonstrating the fact that, despite appearances, these two functions are not inverses of each other.
In many cases we need to find the concentration of acid from a pH measurement. The inverse function  is used.

Generalizations

Partial inverses

For example, the function

 

is not one-to-one, since . However, the function becomes one-to-one if we restrict to the domain , in which case

 

Alternatively, there is no need to restrict the domain if we are content with the inverse being a multivalued function:

 

For a continuous function on the real line, one branch is required between each pair of local extrema. For example, the inverse of a cubic function with a local maximum and a local minimum has three branches (see the adjacent picture).

These considerations are particularly important for defining the inverses of trigonometric functions. For example, the sine function is not one-to-one, since

 

for every real  (and more generally  for every integer ). However, the sine is one-to-one on the interval
, and the corresponding partial inverse is called the arcsine. The following table describes the principal branch of each inverse trigonometric function:

Left and right inverses
Function composition on the left and on the right need not coincide.  In general, the conditions 
 "There exists  such that " and 
 "There exists  such that "

Left inverses
 If , then .

A function  with nonempty domain is injective if and only if it has a left inverse.  An elementary proof runs as follows:
Let ; this definition is unique because  is injective. By construction, the condition for a left inverse.

In classical mathematics, every injective function  with a nonempty domain necessarily has a left inverse; however, this may fail in constructive mathematics. For instance, a left inverse of the inclusion  of the two-element set in the reals violates indecomposability by giving a retraction of the real line to the set .

Right inverses

 

That is, the function  satisfies the rule

 If , then 

Thus,  may be any of the elements of  that map to  under .

A function  has a right inverse if and only if it is surjective (though constructing such an inverse in general requires the axiom of choice).

For all , there is  such that .

Two-sided inverses
An inverse that is both a left and right inverse (a two-sided inverse), if it exists, must be unique. In fact, if a function has a left inverse and a right inverse, they are both the same two-sided inverse, so it can be called the inverse.

A function has a two-sided inverse if and only if it is bijective.
 A bijective function  is injective, so it has a left inverse (if  is the empty function,  is its own left inverse).  is surjective, so it has a right inverse. By the above, the left and right inverse are the same.

Preimages
If  is any function (not necessarily invertible), the preimage (or inverse image) of an element  is defined to be the set of all elements of  that map to :

 

The preimage of  can be thought of as the image of  under the (multivalued) full inverse of the function .

 

For example, take the function . This function is not invertible as it is not bijective, but preimages may be defined for subsets of the codomain, e.g.

 .

See also
 Lagrange inversion theorem, gives the Taylor series expansion of the inverse function of an analytic function
 Integral of inverse functions
 Inverse Fourier transform
 Reversible computing

Notes

References

Bibliography

Further reading

External links

 

Basic concepts in set theory
 
Unary operations